Irene Calvert (10 February 1909 – 19 May 2000) was a Northern Irish politician and economist who served as a Member of Parliament for Queen's University Belfast.

Early life and education 
Born in Belfast, as Lilian Irene Mercer Earls, she studied at Methodist College Belfast but for health reasons did not take examinations. Leaving school at the age of 18, she worked for some years in various stores, before going to Queen's University Belfast from 1933 to 1936 to study economics and philosophy.

Career 
In 1941, she was appointed to the vacant post of Chief Welfare Officer for Northern Ireland, immediately having to organise care for a flood of wartime evacuees including those evacuated to Northern Ireland from Gibraltar.

In 1944, Calvert, who had developed an interest in politics after her welfare work, was urged to contest a by-election for the Queen's University Belfast constituency to put a woman's point of view. She was unsuccessful but stood again in the 1945 Northern Ireland general election, as an independent candidate, and on this occasion succeeded in taking a seat. She held the seat until she stood down at the 1953 election. In Parliament, she refused to discuss the constitutional question, which she regarded as a distraction from the real task of social reform, including the passage of the Education Act, 1947. In her resignation speech, she did however question whether the Northern Irish economy could thrive while the partition of Ireland continued.

In 1950 Calvert began working at the Ulster Weaving Company as an economist, and having successfully helped build up their institutional sales was appointed a managing director. In 1956 she was invited to become a group chairman at the Duke of Edinburgh's Study Conference on Industry. She also served on the Belfast City Chamber of Commerce, becoming its first (and indeed only) woman president in 1965 and 1966. She also served on Queen's University's Senate and Board of Curators, and was active in The Irish Association for Cultural, Economic and Social Relations.

In 1964, she took up the position of executive manager (subsequently development manager) of the parent company of Great Southern Hotels and the Irish railway catering enterprise, a subsidiary of CIÉ, the State-owned transport authority.  She worked there until early 1970. In 1970, she was briefly Head of Households for Doris Duke. She retired to Dublin, where she was an active supporter of the Irish Labour Party well into her eighties.

Personal life
Calvert married Raymond Colville Calvert. They met in 1926 at the University Drama Society. He was a stockbroker and writer, including poems, ballads, and radio plays. He died suddenly 11 July 1959 in Bangor, County Down. They had a son Peter who was with his mother when she died. Calvert died at the Royal Hospital, Donnybrook, on 19 May 2000.

References

1909 births
People educated at Methodist College Belfast
Alumni of Queen's University Belfast
20th-century Irish economists
Irish women economists
20th-century  British economists
Members of the House of Commons of Northern Ireland for Queen's University of Belfast
Women members of the House of Commons of Northern Ireland
Independent members of the House of Commons of Northern Ireland
Members of the House of Commons of Northern Ireland 1945–1949
Members of the House of Commons of Northern Ireland 1949–1953
2000 deaths